Kamal Rifaat (1 November 1921 – 13 July 1977) was an Egyptian military officer and one of the members of the Free Officers movement. He held several government posts after the Egyptian revolution in 1952.

Early life and education
Kamal Rifaat was born in Alexandria on 1 November 1921. His father was an engineer. After completing primary and secondary education in Cairo Kamal Rifaat graduated from the military academy.

Career
Kamal Rifaat joined the Egyptian army in 1941 and served there until 1945. He was part of the Iron Guard along with Captain Mustafa Kamal Sidqi and Anwar Sadat which was composed of the supporters of King Farouk. Then he worked in Khartoum, Sudan, in a secret organization to resist the British occupation. Next, he participated in the 1948 Palestine War during which he met Gamal Abdel Nasser. 

Rifaat joined the Free Officers movement which carried out the Egyptian revolution in 1952. He was part of the first cell of the movement founded by Nasser. He was among those who had Marxist views in the group and had a Titoist leaning. Rifaat became a member of the 14-member Revolution Command Council following the 1952 revolution. However, he was among the non-voting members of the council. Rifaat was made acting minister of social affairs on 12 October 1961 when Syrian ministers vacated their posts in the cabinet. When a cabinet was formed on 18 October he was permanently appointed to the post and remained in office until September 1962. 

On 27 September 1962 a new constitution was accepted and then, a presidential council was formed under the presidency of Nasser. Rifaat was one of the members of this council. In addition, he served in various posts, including the minister of labor (June 1967–November 1970), director of ideological development within the Workers' Bureau of the Arab Socialist Union and the government publishing houses as well as the director of the modernization" program at Al Azhar University. Between 1971 and 1973 Kamal was the ambassador to the United Kingdom.

In 1976 Rifaat co-founded the National Progressive Unionist Party with Khaled Mohieddin, another member of the Revolution Command Council, known as Free Officers Movement.

Death and honors
Kamal Rifaat died on 13 July 1977. He was the recipient of the Order of the Republic and several decorations from Cameroon, Morocco, Yugoslavia and Tunisia.

References

External links
 Kamal Rifaat interview in 1973 Pathé News

20th-century diplomats
20th-century Egyptian politicians
1921 births
1977 deaths
Ambassadors of Egypt to the United Kingdom
Egyptian communists
Egyptian military leaders
Free Officers Movement (Egypt)
Labour ministers of Egypt
Politicians from Alexandria
Egyptian political party founders
Egyptian people of the 1948 Arab–Israeli War
National Progressive Unionist Party politicians
Egyptian Military Academy alumni